This is a list of castles in Skåne, most of which were originally built between 1100 and 1600 while Skåne was a Danish province. Since 1658, Skåne is a historic province of Sweden. Many of the castles were built or rebuilt in the 16th century and remodeled in the 19th century, often in Dutch Renaissance style.

Alphabetical order

Castles and abbeys

Castle ruins 
Gladsaxehus
Lillö Ruin
Lindholmen Castle
Månstorp Gables
Uraniborg

Ordered by municipality

See also
List of castles in Sweden

Gallery of Scanian castles

External links

Skånska slott - Scanian castles - Web portal by Gröna Nyckeln, Simrishamn, Skåne
Jönsson, Lars. Gladsaxehus: En medeltida länsborg. Archeological report (in Swedish)
Åkesson, Sylve. "Wanås: Göingarnas borg". Castles and manor-seats in Skåne.

Scania
Architecture in Sweden
Skane
Lists of buildings and structures in Sweden